"Centerfold" is a 1981 single released by the J. Geils Band from their album Freeze Frame. The most successful single of the group's career, it reached number one on the US Billboard Hot 100 chart in February 1982 and held that spot for six weeks.

Overview
The song is about a man who is shocked to discover that his high school crush appeared in a centerfold spread for an unspecified men's magazine. The song's narrator is torn between conflicting feelings: his disappointment due to her loss of innocence, and his lust until the end of the song.

The song was the band's biggest hit and the only one in the top of the US charts. It was released in autumn 1981, and eventually went to number one on the US Billboard Hot 100 in February 1982, and stayed there for six weeks. It was the first single released from the album Freeze Frame and the music video for the song was an early staple on recently launched MTV. It also peaked at number one in Australia and Canada.

In February 1982, after the song hit No. 1 in the US, "Centerfold" peaked at No. 3 in the UK Top 40, earning the J. Geils Band their only major hit single in the UK, although follow-up "Freeze-Frame" would also peak within the top 40 at No. 27. The song is one of the on-disc songs on the 2010 music video game Rock Band 3.

Record World called it a "clever rocker" and said that "the na-na chorus and Peter Wolf's carefree vocals add up to an AOR-pop hit."

In 2018, the song was ranked at No. 66 on Billboards All Time Top Songs.  Ultimate Classic Rock critic Michael Gallucci rated it to be the band's all-time greatest song.

Charts

Weekly charts

Year-end charts

All-time charts

Certifications and sales

See also 
 List of number-one singles in Australia during the 1980s
 List of RPM number-one singles of 1982
 List of Hot 100 number-one singles of 1982 (U.S.)
 List of number-one mainstream rock hits (United States)

References

External links 
 Lyrics of this song
 

1981 singles
Number-one singles in Australia
Billboard Hot 100 number-one singles
Cashbox number-one singles
RPM Top Singles number-one singles
EMI America Records singles
The J. Geils Band songs
Songs written by Seth Justman
Song recordings produced by Seth Justman
1980 songs
Works about pornography